Baker Gurvitz Army were an English rock group. Their self-titled debut album featured a blend of hard rock laced with Ginger Baker's jazz- and Afrobeat-influenced drumming. The lengthy "Mad Jack" was that album's outstanding track, and the album hit the US  Billboard 200 chart, and peaked at number 22 in the UK Albums Chart. The two following albums contained similar material, although neither charted in the UK nor the US.

History
When Cream split up in 1968, Ginger Baker was invited to join Blind Faith, which formed the following year. This was not such a successful venture and following its demise, Baker put together his own outfit, Ginger Baker's Air Force, in 1970. 

Former The Gun and Three Man Army members, brothers Paul and Adrian Gurvitz were looking for a new way ahead after early successes, so they joined forces with Baker in 1974. In their first year they recorded one live and one studio album, following with two more studio albums, Elysian Encounter and Hearts On Fire. However, the death of their manager led to the band breaking up in 1976. In 2003, a compilation album, Flying In And Out Of Stardom, was released, including four new live songs.

Discography

Studio albums 
Baker Gurvitz Army (1974)
Elysian Encounter (1975)
Hearts On Fire (1976)

Live albums
 Live In Derby '75 (1975)
 Live Live Live (2005)
 Still Alive (2008)
 Live in Milan Italy 1976 (2010) – Part of The Official Ginger Baker Bootleg Series

Other release
Flying In & Out Of Stardom - The Anthology (2003) (compilation)

Members
Ginger Baker: drums
Adrian Gurvitz: guitar, vocals
Paul Gurvitz: bass guitar, backing vocals
Mr Snips a.k.a. Stephen W. Parsons: lead vocals
Peter Lemer: keyboards

References

External links
 Baker Gurvitz Army article from the official Ginger Baker archive
www.alexgitlin.com/bga
 
 

English hard rock musical groups
Musical groups established in 1974
Musical groups disestablished in 1976
Atco Records artists